The Gwangju–Daegu Expressway(Korean: 광주대구 고속도로) formerly 88 Olympic Expressway(Korean: 88올림픽 고속도로, Pal-pal(88) Oliympic Gosok Doro) is a freeway in South Korea, connecting Gwangju to Daegu (175.3 km). It was only expressway that has 2 lanes in South Korea.

History 
 14 November 1973: Goseo-Damyang Segment opens to traffic for Branch Line of Honam Expressway
 11 October 1981: Construction Begin
 11 August 1984: Damyang-Okpo segment opens to traffic. (2 Lanes)
 7 December 2006: Goseo-Damyang, Goryeong-Okpo segments widen 4~6 lanes.
 8 November 2007: Muan Airport-Gwangju segment opens to traffic. (4 Lanes)
 22 December 2015: Damyang~Goryeong segment will widen 4 lanes.

Compositions

Lanes 
 Goseo JC~Damyang JC, E.Goryeong IC~Okpo JC: 6
 Damyang JC~Damyang IC~E.Goryeong IC: 4

Length 
 181.6 km

Limited Speed 
 Goseo IC~Damyang IC~ E.Goryeong IC~Okpo JC: 100 km/h

List of facilities 

IC: Interchange, JC: Junction, SA: Service Area, TG:Tollgate
 Muan Airport ~ Gwangju segment's name is Muan–Gwangju Expressway.
 ■: Overlap with Honam expressway

See also
 Roads and expressways in South Korea
 Transportation in South Korea

External links
 MOLIT South Korean Government Transport Department

Expressways in South Korea
Roads in Gwangju
Roads in South Jeolla
Roads in North Jeolla
Roads in South Gyeongsang
Roads in North Gyeongsang
Roads in Daegu